The white-capped bunting or chestnut-breasted bunting (Emberiza stewarti) is a species of bird in the family Emberizidae. It is found in Afghanistan, India, Iran, Kazakhstan, Kyrgyzstan, Nepal, Pakistan, Tajikistan, Turkmenistan, and Uzbekistan. Its natural habitats are boreal forests, boreal shrubland, and temperate grassland.

References

white-capped bunting
Birds of Afghanistan
Birds of Central Asia
white-capped bunting
white-capped bunting
Taxonomy articles created by Polbot